The 2021 Ambetter Get Vaccinated 200 was the 19th stock car race of the 2021 NASCAR Xfinity Series, and the 31st iteration of the event. After missing a race in 2020 due to the COVID-19 pandemic, New Hampshire Motor Speedway would be able to get back their race for the 2021 season. The race was held on Saturday, July 17, 2021, in Loudon, New Hampshire at New Hampshire Motor Speedway. Christopher Bell, running a one-off race for Joe Gibbs Racing, would dominate the race and win.

The race was the NASCAR Xfinity Series debut for Dawson Cram.

Background 
New Hampshire Motor Speedway is a 1.058-mile (1.703 km) oval speedway located in Loudon, New Hampshire, which has hosted NASCAR racing annually since the early 1990s, as well as the longest-running motorcycle race in North America, the Loudon Classic. Nicknamed "The Magic Mile", the speedway is often converted into a 1.6-mile (2.6 km) road course, which includes much of the oval.

The track was originally the site of Bryar Motorsports Park before being purchased and redeveloped by Bob Bahre. The track is currently one of eight major NASCAR tracks owned and operated by Speedway Motorsports.

For the second straight race, Michael Annett would have to be subbed in, this time by Josh Berry due to a leg injury Annett suffered.

Entry list 

*Driver would change to Dawson Cram for the race.

Starting lineup 
The starting lineup was based on a formula based on the previous race, the 2021 Credit Karma Money 250. As a result, Jeb Burton of Kaulig Racing won the pole.

Race

Pre-race ceremonies

Race recap

Post-race driver comments

Race results 
Stage 1 Laps: 45

Stage 2 Laps: 45

Stage 3 Laps: 110

References 

2021 NASCAR Xfinity Series
NASCAR races at New Hampshire Motor Speedway
Ambetter Get Vaccinated 200
Ambetter Get Vaccinated 200